Time capture is the concept of making sense of time-related data based on timestamps generated by system software. Software that run on PCs and other digital devices rely on internal software clocks to generate timestamps. In turn, these timestamps serve as the basis for representing when an event has occurred (i.e. when an outgoing call was made), and for how long that event lasted (i.e. the duration of a phone call).

Time capture software use data mining techniques to index, cleanse and make sense of this data. Applications include automated time tracking, where software can track the time a user spends on various PC-based tasks, such as time in applications, files/documents, web pages (via browser), and emails.

This is a comparison of notable time capture software packages.

Microcomputer software